On the federal level, Russia elects a president as head of state and a parliament, one of the two chambers of the Federal Assembly. The president is elected for, at most, two consecutive six-year terms by the people (raised from four years from December 2008). The Federal Assembly (Federalnoe Sobranie) has two chambers. The State Duma (Gosudarstvennaja Duma) has 450 members, elected for five-year terms (also four years up to December 2008). The Federation Council (Sovet Federatsii) is not directly elected; each of the 85 federal subjects of Russia sends 2 delegates to the Federal Council, for a total of 170 members.

Since 1990, there have been seven elections for the presidency and seven for parliament. In the seven presidential elections, only once, in 1996, has a second round been needed. There have been three presidents, with Boris Yeltsin elected in 1991 and 1996, Vladimir Putin in 2000, 2004, 2012 and 2018 and Dmitry Medvedev in 2008. The Communist candidate (of the Communist Party of the Soviet Union or the Communist Party of the Russian Federation) has finished second in every case: Nikolai Ryzhkov in 1991, Gennady Zyuganov in 1996, 2000 and 2008 and 2011, Nikolay Kharitonov in 2004 and Pavel Grudinin in 2018. Only in 1996 has there been a third candidate who gained more than 10% of the votes in the first round, Alexander Lebed.

In the parliamentary elections, the Communist Party was the largest party in the 1995 and 1999 elections, with 35% and 24% of the votes respectively. The Liberal Democratic Party of Russia has ranged from 5 to 15% of the votes, and Yabloko won 10% of the votes in 1995 and around 5% in the other three elections. The only other parties that have achieved more than 10% of the votes have been Democratic Choice of Russia with 16% in 1993, Our Home – Russia with 12% in 1995, and, in 1999, Unity with 23%, Fatherland – All Russia with 13% and People's Deputies Faction with 15%. United Russia, an alliance of Unity and Fatherland – All Russia, became the biggest party with 38% in 2003.

Elections in Russia have not been free and fair under Putin's rule. Political opponents are jailed and repressed, independent media are intimidated and suppressed, and electoral fraud is rampant. Political scientists characterize Russia's political system as "competitive authoritarianism" or a hybrid regime, as it combines authoritarian and democratic institutions.

Federal elections

Presidential

The President is elected in a two-round system every six years, with a limit of two consecutive terms.  Prior to 2012, the term of office was four years. If no candidate wins by an absolute majority in the first round, a second election round is held between two candidates with the most votes. The last presidential election was in 2018, and the next is expected in 2024.

Presidency in the Russian Federation is subject to the articles 80-93 of the Russian Constitution, the information provided in these articles is explanatory to the system of elections in Russia, and the main points to be highlighted are the following:

The president is elected on basis of universal, equal, and direct suffrage through secret ballots.
The president is to be elected for a term of six years
Any citizen of the Russian Federation with 35 or more years of age and that has had a permanent residence for at least 10 years in Russia can run for the presidency in Russia.
The same person may not be elected President of the Russian Federation for more than two terms running.

Parliament

Legislative elections take place in Russia's 85 subjects of federation ranging from oblasts, republics, autonomous territories, and autonomous okrugs.

The elections for the State Duma of Russia are held every five years, and the dispute is for the 450 seats of the Parliament. Half of the seats are allocated through a proportional representation party list voting, with a threshold of 7%. The other half is appointed through majority voting, where one deputy is elected for one constituency. Regional assemblies with their respective deputies are formed through this system. The legislative body of Russia (the Federation Council and the State Duma) are subject to the articles 94-109 of the constitution, and these explain important points about the elections for the parliament in Russia, these are:

The State Duma (lower house) is elected for a term of 5 years.
Any citizen of the Russian Federation who is at least 21 years old can be a candidate.
The president is to call the elections for the State Duma, in accordance with the Constitution.
The Council of the Federation includes two representatives from each subject of the Russian Federation: one from the legislative and one from the executive body of state authority.

In May 2012 President Medvedev signed a new legislation exempting political parties from the need to collect signatures to run in parliamentary elections.

Regional elections

Gubernatorial elections are held yearly and are to be called upon by the president. These happen in September, by default, on the second Sunday of the month, but the timing is not always exact. Campaigning starts 28 days prior to the election.

Governors

Regional parliaments

Local self-government elections

The two main systems of local government include Mayor–council government in which voters cast their ballot for the mayor who represents the executive branch, and another ballot for the city council. The other system is Council–manager government with a city manager, who is nominated by and accountable to the City Duma.

Local mayoral elections

Elections for mayors in Russia are direct and based on universal suffrage, and are held in a small number of cities. Out of the subjects' capitals, only 9 from the 85 recognized territories' capitals have direct mayoral elections. The execution of mayoral elections are dependent upon higher administrative authorities, and, for instance, can be cancelled by governors.

Local legislative elections

Evolution of Russia's electoral law

1993 (Constitution of 1993) – Article 97: Elections in Russia are direct, subject to universal suffrage, and free and fair

1995 – Amendment Article 97: Parties are now required to gather at least 200000 signatures and to sign for candidature no later than 6 months before the elections.

1998 – Constitutional Court Judgement 26-P: 5% threshold is upheld by the Russian constitutional court

2002 – Law number 175: Mixed election of the state Duma is implemented with 50% of seats elected by a majority system for single-seat district votes (one deputy-one seat), and the other 50% through a proportional representation party list voting scheme.

2003 – Mixed system is abolished for a fully proportional representation system, with a 7% threshold.

2013 – Putin requires a return to the old mixed system, making elections for parliament being subject to Law number 175 once again.

Criticism

Presidential influence 
Since the dissolution of the Soviet Union, three successive administrations (Boris Yeltsin, Vladimir Putin, and Dmitry Medvedev) have played a significant role in forming a Russia's party system that has been characterized by the domination of a ruling party which is financed and staffed by choice of the current presidential administration, and which in return provides support to it to serve its interests.

One study from Reuter et al. referred to criticism of mayoral and local self-government election in Russia. Findings being indicated that mayor candidates opposing the present ruling party, United Russia, had their elections cancelled more easily than those that could promote support for the ruling party.

Another study from Enikolopov et al. performed an investigation where observers were strategically placed at polling stations to see the effect of their presence on United Russia's vote shares. Findings reveal that with observers, United Russia experienced an 11% loss in share of votes for the poll chosen.

2007 legislative elections 
Since 1999, when Vladimir Putin became President of Russia there has been increasing international criticism of the conduct of Russian elections. European institutions who observed the December 2007 legislative elections concluded that these were not fair elections. Göran Lennmarker, president of the Parliamentary Assembly of the Organization for Security and Co-operation in Europe (OSCE), said that the elections "failed to meet many of the commitments and standards that we have. It was not a fair election." Luc Van den Brande, who headed a delegation from the Council of Europe, referred to the "overwhelming influence of the president's office and the president on the campaign" and said there was "abuse of administrative resources" designed to influence the outcome. He also said there were "flaws in the secrecy of the vote." "Effectively, we can't say these were fair elections," he said at a news conference.

In February 2008, the human rights organisation Amnesty International said that the presidential election on 2 March would not be a genuine election: "There is no real opposition ahead of the election. There is no real electoral campaign battle," Friederike Behr, Amnesty's Russia researcher, was quoted as saying. In a report on the elections, Amnesty said laws restricting non-government organizations, police breaking up demonstrations, and harassment from critics were all part of "a systematic destruction of civil liberties in Russia." Another human rights organisation, Freedom House, said that the victory of Putin's party in the 2007 elections "was achieved under patently unfair and non-competitive conditions calling into doubt the result’s legitimacy."

The Russian government has acted to prevent international observers monitoring Russian elections. In 2007 the OSCE was prevented from monitoring the legislative elections held in December. In February 2008 the European Office for Democratic Institutions and Human Rights announced that it would not send observers to monitor the presidential election on 2 March, citing what it called "severe restrictions" imposed on its work by the Russian government. "We made every effort in good faith to deploy our mission, even under the conditions imposed by the Russian authorities", said Christian Strohal, the organization's director. "The Russian Federation has created limitations that are not conducive to undertaking election observation". The OSCE has also withdrawn its attempts to monitor the elections.

2011 legislative elections 

The 2011 Russian legislative elections were considered to be rigged in favor of the ruling party by a number of journalists and opposition representatives. However public opinion-polls prior to the election suggested that the ruling party could count on the support of 45–55 percent of voters, which may suggest that there were no mass falsifications, despite isolated cases of fraud. Nationwide exit polls were very close to the final results.

2016 Russian legislative election 

In 2015, the OSCE called on the Russian government to respect and support the work of independent election observers. This followed a number of incidents where citizen observers were beaten or harassed during regional elections. There were also accusations of widespread voter nudging to increase attendance in unpopular or controversial votes by offering financial bonuses for everyone attending, such as free food, toys, etc.

2021 Russian legislative election 

In the 2021 State Duma elections, the Putin appointed government headed by Mikhail Mishustin prevented OSCE observers from taking part in Russian elections. Citing COVID-19 restrictions, officials severely restricted their capacity and access.

Latest elections

Presidential

Legislative

See also
2019 national electoral calendar
Elections in the Soviet Union
Electoral system
Russian opposition
Red Belt (Russia)
Russian Republic
Term limits in Russia

References

External links

OSCE reports on elections in Russia
Geo-electoral structure of Russia (N.Grishin)